No Daylights... Nor Heeltaps is the eleventh studio album by British folk metal band Skyclad and the band's first recording to feature Kevin Ridley as the main vocalist. It is described as an "Irish Pub Album" with semi-acoustic versions of older Skyclad classics. Some versions feature a bonus CD with five extra songs.

There was some controversy raised over this release by former front-man Martin Walkyier and his fans because he was not credited in the booklet for writing the lyrics. Although nothing much arose from this affair, the band has not yet released any more re-recordings, instead focusing on new material written entirely by the current line-up.

Track listing

2002 albums
Skyclad (band) albums
Albums produced by Kevin Ridley